Scott Evans (born December 1, 1986) is an American television personality, best known as a co-anchor for Access Hollywood. Evans previously served as the east coast correspondent, but as of September 2017, is working out of the Los Angeles office. He joined the NBC show World of Dance as the host for the third and fourth seasons.  Evans credits sports television host and reporter, Stacy Paetz for getting him into the television business.

Career
Previously, Evans was the host and MC at the home games for NBA's Indiana Pacers and WNBA's Indiana Fever.

From 2012 to 2015, Evans was a Channel One News anchor.

Evans took over hosting duties from Jenna Dewan for the third season NBC's World of Dance.

In November 2021, Evans signed an overall talent and development deal with NBCUniversal.

Filmography

References

External links
 

1986 births
Living people
American television personalities
Male television personalities